"Wishes" is a song recorded and written by Danish singer-songwriter Oh Land. It was released as a single on 22 November 2019 through Tusk or Tooth Records.

Background and release 
The single cover artwork was created by the Danish graphic design firm Hvass&Hannibal, designers of the cover for Oh Land's third remix extended play, Replanting Family Tree (2019). "Salt" was released for digital download and streaming in Denmark on 22 November 2019, through Tusk or Tooth Records. Outside of Denmark, the single was self-released by Oh Land to digital retailers.

Release history

References 

2019 singles
2019 songs
Christmas songs
Oh Land songs
Songs written by Oh Land